A burnisher is a hand tool used in woodworking for creating a burr on a card scraper.

Description 
Purpose-manufactured burnishers are polished smooth, typically made from high speed steel (HSS) or cemented carbide, and usually have wooden handles. The shaft profile is usually round, but other profiles include oval and triangular.

Substitutes for shop-bought burnishers are often made with other common workshop items of hardened steels or cemented carbide, such as the back of a gouge, a bevel edged chisel, a nail punch, or an HSS drill bit. Alternatively the woodworker might use a carbide or HSS rod marketed for other uses.

Limitations 
To work effectively, a burnisher must be much harder than the scraper. Modern scrapers are typically manufactured from harder steels than in the past, and require burnishing with harder materials, making some traditional makeshift burnishers less effective on modern scrapers.

Use 

Once the edges and faces of a card scraper has been filed or ground flat and square, the burnisher is repeatedly rubbed at a slight angle along the scraper's edges, creating a small burr. The specifics of the process can vary significantly between woodworkers.

See also 

 Card scraper
 Burnishing (metal)

References 

Woodworking hand tools